The Blue Gardenia is a 1953 American film noir starring Anne Baxter, Richard Conte, and Ann Sothern.  Directed by Fritz Lang from a screenplay by Charles Hoffman, it is based on the novella The Gardenia by Vera Caspary. 

An independent production distributed by Warner Bros., The Blue Gardenia – a cynical take on press coverage of a sensational murder case (the Black Dahlia) – was the first installment of Lang's "newspaper noir" film trio, being followed in 1956 by both While the City Sleeps and Beyond a Reasonable Doubt. 

The song "Blue Gardenia" was written by Bob Russell and Lester Lee and arranged by Nelson Riddle. The director of cinematography for The Blue Gardenia was RKO regular Nicholas Musuraca, then working at Warner Brothers.

Plot
Norah Larkin (Anne Baxter) is a single woman who works as an L.A. switchboard operator along with her roommates, Crystal Carpenter (Ann Sothern) and Sally Ellis (Jeff Donnell). On her birthday that night she decides to celebrate by dining alone at home with the picture of her fiancé, a soldier serving in the Korean War. At the candlelit dinner table she opens the latest letter from him only to receive a Dear Jane letter revealing his plans to marry a nurse he met in Tokyo.

Devastated, Norah accepts a date over the telephone with a womanizing calendar girl artist Harry Prebble (Raymond Burr) that had been sizing up prospects earlier that day at the telephone office. When she arrives at the Blue Gardenia South Seas-themed restaurant Harry is surprised to see Norah rather than Crystal. Immediately he plies her with strong tropical cocktails, one after the next till she is completely but happily soused. Pianist Nat King Cole croons in the background, highlighting his popular song "Blue Gardenia". 

Harry whisks her to his apartment to "show her his art", and plays the same Cole record on his phonograph. He puts on all his moves, but Norah passes out on his couch.  Persisting, he awakens her, she resists, then strikes him with a fire poker, shattering a mirror. Semi-conscious, she flees the scene, leaving her black suede pumps behind.

The next morning Norah is awakened by Crystal and discovers she has a complete blackout of what happened the previous night. Meanwhile, police at the crime scene question Harry's maid (Almira Sessions), who admits to cleaning the poker and placing the shoes in the closet, ruining the crime scene.

Police arrive at the telephone office to question women who had posed for Harry's girlie drawings. When Norah learns why, she is startled and immediately seeks the nearest newspaper account of the slaying. It revives a vague flashback of wielding a fire poker and shattering a mirror.

Evoking the macabre specter of the Black Dahlia slaying, popular Los Angeles Chronicle columnist Casey Mayo (Richard Conte) dubs the presumed killer the "Blue Gardenia murderess".  He learns from the restaurant waiter that the mystery woman was a blonde, and from its blind female flower seller (Celia Lovsky) that she had a "quiet voice". That night Sally reads aloud the newspaper report that the suspect had been wearing a black dress. Frightened, Norah wraps hers in a newspaper and sneaks out in the wee hours to burn it in an outdoor incinerator. She is harried by a passing patrolman for burning after hours, but left off with a warning.

Seeking to capitalize on the case's publicity, Casey pens a cat's paw entitled "Letter to an Unknown Murderess", calling for her to turn herself in to him rather than the police, promising a fairer shake. He receives many bogus phone calls from local women, but recognizes Norah's as genuine. After one botched attempt, he meets her in his office. She tells him she is speaking for a friend, and Casey reveals that he is willing to pay for top legal representation if that friend agrees to surrender. The two later go to a diner, where Norah tells her supposed amnesiac friend's account of the murder. Casey asks to meet her friend at the diner the next day. Norah agrees and returns home, where she confesses to worldwise roommate Crystal, who is sympathetic.

The next day at the diner Crystal meets Casey and points him to Norah's booth, where she finally drops her gambit. He feels shocked, because he had begun to fall in love with her. He also feels guilty, admitting to her that he was only pretending sympathy for the alleged killer when he thought it was someone else. Shortly afterward the police arrive on a tip from the counter man and arrest Norah. Bitter and confused, she leaves convinced Casey had double-crossed her. 

Leaving town, Casey notices that the music at the airport — the love theme from Tristan und Isolde — is the same composition the maid found playing on Harry's phonograph. Instantly grasping that the records on the machine had been changed, Casey realizes it's possible that Norah was not the killer. Following up his hunch, Casey and Police Captain Haynes (George Reeves) go to a local music shop. The clerk tells them that it was Harry's ex-girlfriend Rose Miller (Ruth Storey) who sold him the record, and calls to her to come out front. Realizing the police are closing in, she locks herself in the rest room and attempts suicide.

From her hospital bed Rose confesses that she had arrived at Harry's apartment after Norah had passed out, distraught, and (implying she was pregnant) demanding that Harry marry her. He refused, and instead started playing the record that had brought them together, Tristan und Isolde. She then noticed Norah's handkerchief on the floor by the record player, and in a rage fueled equally by jealousy and anger bludgeoned Harry with the poker. 

Cleared, Norah is freed. She confides to friends that she has forgiven Casey and wants him, badly. Casey wants her as well, and, learning she's interested, tosses  his "little black book" to his buddy Al  (Richard Erdman).

Cast
 Anne Baxter as Norah Larkin
 Richard Conte as Casey Mayo
 Ann Sothern as Crystal Carpenter
 Raymond Burr as Harry Prebble
 Jeff Donnell as Sally Ellis
 Richard Erdman as Al 
 George Reeves as Police Capt. Sam Haynes
 Ruth Storey as Rose Miller
 Ray Walker as Homer
 Nat King Cole as himself
 Dolores Fuller as woman at bar (uncredited)
 Papa John Creach as man playing violin (uncredited)

Production
The source novella for The Blue Gardenia was written by Vera Caspary and entitled The Gardenia: the eventual amendment of the film's title to The Blue Gardenia was probably intended to attract filmgoers by reminding them of the highly publicized unsolved Black Dahlia murder of 1947. The Gardenia first appeared in the February–March issue of Today's Woman magazine:  however the film rights for the novella had been acquired almost a full year earlier, it being announced in April 1951 that the film, then titled Gardenia, would be a production of  Fidelity Pictures, whose owner, Howard Welsch, had negotiated with Dorothy McGuire to play the female lead role, which was subsequently offered to Linda Darnell, Joan Fontaine, and Margaret Sullavan. (If Sullavan had played the role, [The Blue] Gardenia would have been her final film rather than No Sad Songs for Me in 1950; Sullavan, who died in 1960, would have three television roles in the 1950s, one of them later than 1953.)

In September 1952, the rights to The Gardenia were sold to an independent producer, Alex Gottlieb, and from then on the film was referred to as The Blue Gardenia. Despite reports that the female lead role had been assigned to Darnell, and also to the little-known Vicky Lane, Anne Baxter was announced for the role in November. The Blue Gardenia was considered the second of Baxter's two-picture deal with Warner Bros. as that studio signed to distribute the film. The film's two other top-billed stars were announced the same month. The film's second female lead was Ann Sothern's first cinematic role since she had been dropped by Metro Goldwyn Mayer in 1950 due to her health issues. Prior to filming The Blue Gardenia, Sothern had signed with CBS to star in the sitcom Private Secretary, filming the first episodes in the latter half of December 1952 immediately after her eight days of filming on The Blue Gardenia: Sothern's focus would remain focused on television roles with occasional cinematic forays, her next cinematic credit subsequent to The Blue Gardenia being the 1964 film The Best Man. The last of the film's stars to be announced was male lead Richard Conte, who had previously starred for Alex Gottlieb Productions in The Fighter: Fritz Lang, hired by Gottlieb to direct The Blue Gardenia, had hoped to cast Dana Andrews, established as the top actor of the film noir genre, but Andrews had recently begun a sabbatical from film work.

The filming of The Blue Gardenia commenced 28 November 1952 and was completed Christmas Eve, Lang wrapping the film a day earlier than its 21-day filming schedule.

Reportedly Ruth Storey, the actress married to the film's leading man Richard Conte, while visiting her husband on-set during filming, accepted the producer's spontaneous suggestion that she play Rose in the film. Though this role was small, it was pivotal. Another key role – although uncredited – was played by Celia Lovsky, a long-time associate of Fritz Lang who had been instrumental in Lang's casting Peter Lorre – for a time Lovsky's husband – in M, Lang's 1931 sound film break-through. Bit parts at the newspaper office were filled by the film's producer Alex Gottlieb and his wife, retired stage actress Polly Rose (sister of composer Billy Rose).

Reception
When the film was first released, the staff at Variety magazine gave The Blue Gardenia a lukewarm review: A stock story and handling keep The Blue Gardenia from being anything more than a regulation mystery melodrama, from a yarn by Vera Caspary. Formula development has an occasional bright spot, mostly because Ann Sothern breathes some life into a stock character and quips ... Baxter and Conte do what they can but fight a losing battle with the script while Burr is a rather obvious wolf. Nat 'King' Cole is spotted to sing the title tune, written by Bob Russell and Lester Lee.

Film director and writer Peter Bogdanovich called The Blue Gardenia "a particularly venomous picture of American life". In 1965, Fritz Lang – responding to Bogdanovich's assertion - recalled the film as "my first picture after the McCarthy business and I had to shoot it in twenty days. Maybe that's what made me so venomous". 

In 2004 critic Dennis Schwartz gave the film a mixed review, writing: A minor film noir from Fritz Lang (Clash by Night/The Big Heat) that never has a chance to bloom because of its dull script. It is based on the short story "Gardenia" by Vera Caspary. It plays as an unimaginative newspaper melodrama that takes jabs at the middle-class and how neurotic and fearful they are about romance. Nat 'King' Cole makes a welcome cameo as the house pianist at the nightclub called The Blue Gardenia, crooning in his velvet voice the titular theme song. Noted cinematographer Nicholas Musuraca injects the film with some intriguing noir touches, such as those ominous rain drops on Raymond Burr's window the night of the murder ... Lang himself in interviews dismissed the film as a "job-for-hire". ... But the story itself wasn't original and the acting wasn't engaging enough to elevate it past being a mild thriller.

A Lux Radio Theatre adaptation of The Blue Gardenia aired on November 30, 1954, with the lead roles taken by Dana Andrews – in the role Fritz Lang had wanted him to play in the film – and Ruth Roman: Andrews later played the male lead in both the 1956 films While the City Sleeps and Beyond a Reasonable Doubt, which were the second and third installments of the "newspaper noir" trilogy that Lang began with The Blue Gardenia (Lang was not involved in the Lux Radio production).

References

Other reading

External links
 
 
 
 
 The Blue Gardenia at Senses of Cinema

1953 films
1950s crime thriller films
1950s English-language films
American crime thriller films
American black-and-white films
Film noir
Films about journalists
Films based on novellas
Films based on works by Vera Caspary
Films directed by Fritz Lang
Films scored by Raoul Kraushaar
Films set in Los Angeles
Warner Bros. films
1950s American films